Willkommen bei Mario Barth-Episoden is a German television series.

See also
List of German television series

External links
 

2009 German television series debuts
2010s German television series
German comedy television series
German-language television shows
RTL (German TV channel) original programming